Rosholt is a surname. Notable people with the surname include:

 Jake Rosholt, professional mixed martial artist and former collegiate amateur wrestler
 Jared Rosholt, professional mixed martial artist and former collegiate amateur wrestler
 Jerry Rosholt, author and historian
 Nils Røsholt, Norwegian politician
John Gilbert Rosholt, for whom Rosholt, Wisconsin, United States is named. He built the first sawmill in the village in 1884.
Julius Rosholt, for whom Rosholt, South Dakota, United States is named. He was credited with bringing the railroad to town in 1913.